Agassiziella picalis is a moth in the family Crambidae. It is found in central India.

References

Acentropinae
Moths of Asia
Moths described in 1854